Casaletto di Sopra is a comune (municipality) in the Province of Cremona in the Italian region Lombardy, located about  east of Milan and about  northwest of Cremona.

Casaletto di Sopra borders the following municipalities: Barbata, Camisano, Fontanella, Offanengo, Ricengo, Romanengo, Soncino, Ticengo.

References

Cities and towns in Lombardy